Cassia wine, osmanthus wine, or Kuei Hua Chen Chiew is an alcoholic Chinese drink, sometimes sweetened, produced from weak baijiu and flavored with sweet osmanthus flowers. It is distilled, but typically has an alcohol content less than 20%.

While the plant itself is sometimes associated with cinnamon, the blossoms' lactones impart a flavor closer to apricots and peaches.

Owing to the time at which Osmanthus fragrans flowers, 'cassia' wine is the traditional choice for the "reunion wine" drunk on the Mid-Autumn or Mooncake Festival. It is also considered a medicinal wine in traditional Chinese medicine. Li Shizhen's Compendium of Materia Medica credits sweet osmanthus with "curing the hundred diseases" and "raising the spirit".

Within China, cassia wine is associated with Xi'an and Guizhou, but production now occurs throughout China, including Beijing and at the Hong Jiang Winery in Hunan.

Despite the name, the Chinese cassia tree (Cinnamomum cassia) is not used to flavor cassia wine.

In popular culture
The drink is referenced many times in the game Genshin Impact as the favourite beverage of the character Zhongli. The wine is also frequently referenced in Chinese period dramas (often referred to as Xianxia or Wuxia).

References

Chinese wine